The Tiaret massacres took place on 9 July and 2 September 2001 in the town of Tiaret, Algeria. The first massacre happened on 9 July when an armed group attacked the home of a family of eight overnight. The militants shot dead the father and five of the six children, the mother was wounded and the sixth child was kidnapped. The house was burned down afterwards. Fighters of the Armed Islamic Group of Algeria were active in this area. The second massacre happened on 2 September when militants killed eight people, including four women, in a poor district of Tiaret. Fire more people from the same family were beheaded as they returned by taxi to their home near Mascara.

References 

2001 in Algeria
Massacres in 2001
Algerian Civil War